Doubleclick is a musician and producer based in the United Kingdom.

Joe Chapman released Once More with Feeling EP on Brighton-based label, Fly Casual, in 2000. He later collaborated with Amon Tobin on Verbal Remixes & Collaborations in 2003. In 2009, he and Amon Tobin, under the name Two Fingers, released a self-titled album and a corresponding album of instrumentals. His musical influences include Drum & Bass and Jungle music.

Discography

Albums and collaborations 
Once More with Feeling EP (2000, Fly Casual)
Tracks: "Once More with Feeling", "All in One Light", "War Peace and Quiet"
Amon Tobin - Verbal Remixes & Collaborations (2003, Ninja Tune)
Two Fingers as Two Fingers (2009 Paper Bag Records)
Instrumentals as Two Fingers (2009 Paper Bag Records)

Verbal remixes and collaborations 
"Ownage courtesy Tobin and Doubleclick, is the type of track you'd play to permantly scar the neighbors." -weeklydig.com (2003)

External links
Official Artist Website
Fly Casual
Ninja Tune

British record producers
British house musicians
Year of birth missing (living people)
Living people